Pholcus manueli, known generally as the cellar spider or daddy longlegs, is a species of cellar spider in the family Pholcidae. It is found in Russia, Turkmenistan, China, Korea, Japan, and the United States.

References

Pholcidae
Articles created by Qbugbot
Spiders described in 1937